Warsaw is a town in Duplin County, North Carolina, United States. The population was 3,054 at the 2010 census.

History
The Warsaw Historic District and Joshua James Blanchard House are listed on the National Register of Historic Places.

Geography
Warsaw is located in western Duplin County at  (35.00, -78.09). U.S. Route 117 passes through the center of town as Pine Street; it leads north  to Goldsboro and south  to Wallace. North Carolina Highway 50 (Memorial Drive) intersects US 117 at the north end of town and leads east  to Kenansville, the Duplin County seat.

Demographics

2020 census

As of the 2020 United States census, there were 2,733 people, 1,139 households, and 547 families residing in the town.

2000 census
As of the census of 2000, there were 3,051 people, 1,187 households, and 777 families residing in the town. The population density was 1,093.0 people per square mile (422.2/km). There were 1,331 housing units at an average density of 476.8/sq mi (184.2/km). The racial makeup of the town was 35.89% White, 50.54% African American, 0.23% Native American, 0.10% Asian, 0.59% Pacific Islander, 11.86% from other races, and 0.79% from two or more races. Hispanic or Latino of any race were 15.77% of the population.

There were 1,187 households, out of which 31.6% had children under the age of 18 living with them, 38.3% were married couples living together, 23.3% had a female householder with no husband present, and 34.5% were non-families. 31.3% of all households were made up of individuals, and 13.9% had someone living alone who was 65 years of age or older. The average household size was 2.47 and the average family size was 3.06.

In the town, the population was spread out, with 27.1% under the age of 18, 10.0% from 18 to 24, 26.5% from 25 to 44, 19.3% from 45 to 64, and 17.1% who were 65 years of age or older. The median age was 34 years. For every 100 females, there were 85.5 males. For every 100 females age 18 and over, there were 79.7 males.

The median income for a household in the town was $23,358, and the median income for a family was $27,473. Males had a median income of $20,859 versus $19,861 for females. The per capita income for the town was $12,476. About 24.3% of families and 30.9% of the population were below the poverty line, including 36.7% of those under age 18 and 26.1% of those age 65 or over.

References

External links
 Town of Warsaw official website

Towns in Duplin County, North Carolina
Towns in North Carolina